Yao Yige (born 30 April 1996) is a Chinese backstroke swimmer. She competed for China at the 2012 Summer Olympics.

See also
China at the 2012 Summer Olympics - Swimming

References

1996 births
Living people
Chinese female backstroke swimmers
Swimmers from Liaoning
Swimmers at the 2012 Summer Olympics
Olympic swimmers of China
21st-century Chinese women